Atzara is a comune (municipality) in the Province of Nuoro in the Italian region Sardinia, located about  north of Cagliari and about  southwest of Nuoro.

Atzara borders the following municipalities: Belvì, Meana Sardo, Samugheo, Sorgono.

History 
Located in Barbagia, the original village date back to the years around 1000 and developed near the spring of Bingia de giosso, still existing.  The old town centre is divided in the ancient districts of Su Fruscu, Lodine, Montiga e Josso, Montiga e Susu, Sa Cora Manna, Su Cuccuru de Santu Giorgi and Tzùri. It was part of the Giudicato of Arborea.

References

Cities and towns in Sardinia
Articles which contain graphical timelines